Helio may refer to:

 Helio AU-24 Stallion
 Helio (wireless carrier), a defunct American wireless communications provider (2005–2010); originally a joint venture between SK Telecom and EarthLink, purchased by Virgin Mobile USA in 2008
 Helio (Cambridge Glass), a short-lived glassware range
 Helio Aircraft Company, an aircraft manufacturing company
 Helio Courier, a light C/STOL utility aircraft designed in 1949

Technology
 Helio, a series of mobile CPU and GPU developed by Mediatek.

People
 Helio Castro
 Helio Fallas Venegas
 Helio Gallardo
 Helio Koa'eloa
 Helio Vera

See also 
 Hélio, a surname (including a list of people with the name)
 Helios (disambiguation)
 Elio (disambiguation)
 Heliocentrism